A constitutional referendum was held in the Central African Republic on 1 February 1981, following the overthrow of Jean-Bédel Bokassa in 1979. The new constitution would make the country a presidential republic with a unicameral National Assembly, as well as restoring multi-party democracy for the first time since 1962. It was approved by 98.55% of voters with a 92.53% turnout.

Following the referendum, presidential elections were held on 15 March. However, a military coup occurred on 1 September, before parliamentary elections could take place.

Results

References

1981 referendums
1981 in the Central African Republic
1981
Constitutional referendums